Neot Mordechai is a kibbutz in northern Israel. Located in the Upper Galilee, it falls under the jurisdiction of Upper Galilee Regional Council.

History
The kibbutz was established on 2 November 1946 by Jewish immigrants from Czechoslovakia, Germany and Austria. It was named in honour of Mordechai Rozovsky, a Zionist activist in Argentina. Aside from agriculture, the kibbutz is the home of Teva Naot,  a shoe factory with branches all over Israel.

References

External links

Official website 
Teva Sport Sandals 

Kibbutzim
Kibbutz Movement
Populated places established in 1946
Populated places in Northern District (Israel)
1946 establishments in Mandatory Palestine
Austrian-Jewish culture in Israel
Czech-Jewish culture in Israel
German-Jewish culture in Israel
Slovak-Jewish culture in Israel